David Keenan is a Gaelic footballer from County Roscommon. He plays his club football with St Barry's, and played with the Roscommon senior football team. He was a member of the Roscommon minor team that beat Kerry in the 2006 All-Ireland Minor Football Championship final. In 2010, he was part of the DCU team that won the 2010 O'Byrne Cup beating Louth in the final and the Sigerson Cup beating UCC. In 2010 he was a member of the senior Roscommon team that won the Connacht Senior Football Championship by beating Sligo by one point.

References
 http://hoganstand.com/roscommon/ArticleForm.aspx?ID=109141
 http://hoganstand.com/roscommon/ArticleForm.aspx?ID=142707
 http://hoganstand.com/Roscommon/ArticleForm.aspx?ID=66391

Year of birth missing (living people)
Living people
DCU Gaelic footballers
Roscommon inter-county Gaelic footballers
St Barry's (Roscommon) Gaelic footballers